is a Japanese anime director. He worked at the Tatsunoko Animation Technical Institute before joining Tezuka Productions. He has directed Mokke and Allison & Lillia and drawn storyboards for all episodes. His favorite anime is Haguregumo.

Works 
Blue Blink (1989–1990; in-between animation)
The Three-Eyed One (1990–1991; key animation)
Ambassador Magma (1993; key animation)
Benkei and Ushiwakamaru (1994; director)
Essay on Insects (1995; animation director)
Black Jack: Capital Transfer To Heian (1996; character designer)
Kimba the White Lion (1997; storyboard, key animation)
Saving our Fragile Earth: Unico Special Chapter (2000–2001; director, animation director, key animation)
Princess Knight (1999; animation director)
Metropolis (2001; key animation)
Black Jack (2004; screenplay, production, animation director)
Phoenix (2004; character designer)
Eyeshield 21 (2005–2008; director)
Mokke (2007–2008; director)
Allison & Lillia (2008; director, storyboard)
Black Jack Final (2011; animation director; episode 12)

References

External links 

Anime directors
Living people
1966 births